Männiku may refer to several places in Estonia:

Männiku, Tallinn, a neighborhood of Tallinn
Männiku, Haapsalu, a neighborhood of Haapsalu
Männiku, Saku Parish, a village in Saku Parish, Harju County
Männiku, Lääne County, a village in Martna Parish, Lääne County
Männiku, Rapla County, a village in Märjamaa Parish, Rapla County
Männiku, Saare County, a village in Saaremaa Parish, Saare County

See also
Männik, Estonian surname